Alina Grosu (born in Chernivtsi, Ukraine) is a Ukrainian singer from the Romanian minority. She released her first studio album in 2000 and has released a total of four albums.

Grosu was born in Chernivtsi, Ukraine. She entered the music business after winning in a singing contest. The prize was to record a song in a studio, where she met the singer Iryna Bilyk. They released four albums. After her success in music, she moved to Kyiv for practical reasons.

Grosu has participated in singing contests such as Slavianski Bazaar in Vitebsk and Junior Eurovision Song Contest national finals.

Discography
 2000 — Разом зі мною
 2002 — Бджілка
 2004 — Море волнуется
 2006 — Я кохана донечка
 2006 — Хочу шалить
 2007 — На 19 этаже
 2010 — Мелом на асфальте
 2018 — Бас

References

1995 births
Living people
Musicians from Chernivtsi
21st-century Ukrainian women singers
Ukrainian pop singers
English-language singers from Ukraine
Ukrainian people of Romanian descent
Child pop musicians